Expert Review of Medical Devices is a monthly peer-reviewed medical journal covering research on the clinical use of devices. It was established in 2004 and is published by Informa. According to the Journal Citation Reports, the journal has a 2013 impact factor of 1.784.

References

External links 
 

Engineering journals
English-language journals
Expert Review journals
Monthly journals
Publications established in 2004
General medical journals